Olericulture is the science of vegetable growing, dealing with the culture of non-woody (herbaceous) plants for food.

Olericulture is the production of plants for use of the edible parts. Vegetable crops can be classified into nine major categories:

 Potherbs and greens – spinach and collards 
 Salad crops – lettuce, celery 
 Cole crops – cabbage and cauliflower 
 Root crops (tubers) – potatoes, beets, carrots, radishes 
 Bulb crops – onions, leeks 
 Legumes – beans, peas 
 Cucurbits – melons, squash, cucumber 
 Solanaceous crops – tomatoes, peppers, potatoes
 Sweet corn 

Olericulture deals with the production, storage, processing and marketing of vegetables. It encompasses crop establishment, including cultivar selection, seedbed preparation and establishment of vegetable crops by seed and transplants. 

It also includes maintenance and care of vegetable crops as well commercial and non-traditional vegetable crop production including organic gardening and organic farming; sustainable agriculture and horticulture; hydroponics; and biotechnology.

See also 
 Agriculture – the cultivation of animals, plants, fungi and other life forms for food, fiber, and other products used to sustain life.
 Horticulture – the industry and science of plant cultivation including the process of preparing soil for the planting of seeds, tubers, or cuttings.
 Pomology – a branch of botany that studies and cultivates pome fruit, and sometimes applied more broadly, to the cultivation of any type of fruit.
 Tropical horticulture – a branch of horticulture that studies and cultivates garden plants in the tropics, i.e., the equatorial regions of the world.

References

 Introduction to Olericulture by the Department of Horticulture and Landscape Architecture, Purdue University.

Vegetables
Organic farming
Horticulture
Edible plants